Ricki-Lee, Tim & Joel is an Australian drive radio show with Ricki-Lee Coulter, Tim Blackwell and Joel Creasey. It is broadcast on Nova FM from 4pm to 6pm on weekdays. 

A daily podcast featuring the best bits from each show is available on iTunes and the Nova FM website.

History
Meshel, Tim and Marty commenced broadcasting in 2010 on Nova 106.9 in Brisbane where it was a top rating Breakfast program. In August 2011, it was announced that Fitzy and Wippa would leave Drive to present Breakfast on Nova 969, with Meshel, Tim and Marty taking their place.

In November 2013, Meshel Laurie left the show to host Meshel & Tommy on Nova 100 with comedian Tommy Little in 2014. Kate Ritchie was later announced as Laurie's replacement and joined the show in January 2014.

Kate Ritchie and Tim Blackwell host the show from Nova 96.9's Sydney studio whilst Joel Creasey hosts the show from Nova 100's Melbourne studio.

In October 2015, Kate, Tim and Marty won Best Networked Program at the Australian Commercial Radio Awards (ACRAs). The team was successful at the ACRA's in 2016 and 2017 as well by taking out the award for Best On-Air Team for FM radio in a metropolitan area.

In 2018, The fifth year of Australia's number one national Drive show, Kate, Tim and Marty will be expanding its reach and simulcasting each episode on 48 regional FM stations from Grant Broadcasters, Ace Radio, Broadcast Operations Group, Red FM and Snow FM. Other popular Nova show Fitzy and Wippa has been broadcasting in most of these markets since 2014.

On 24 July 2020, Marty Sheargold announced his resignation from the show and his last show will be on 11 September. Joel Creasey was later announced as Sheargold's replacement and commenced on 14 September.

In March 2023, Nova announced that Ricki-Lee Coulter will replace Kate Ritchie permanently. Coulter had been filling in for Ritchie since October 2022.

References

External links
Ricki-Lee, Tim & Joel

Australian radio programs
2010s Australian radio programs
2020s Australian radio programs